The 1961–62 Chicago Black Hawks season was the Hawks' 36th season in the NHL, and the club was coming off of a third-place finish in 1960–61, as they finished with a 29–24–17 record, earning 75 points, which was a franchise record, and the first time since 1946 that the Hawks had an over .500 record.

During the off-season, the Black Hawks traded away team captain Ed Litzenberger to the Detroit Red Wings in exchange for Gerry Melnyk and Brian Smith.  Chicago also had some problems signing some of their players, as Stan Mikita, Reg Fleming, and Dollard St. Laurent all refused to sign their contracts, however, they all eventually came to terms.  With Litzenberger traded away, the team named defenseman Pierre Pilote as the new captain.

The defending champions started off the season slow, earning only one win in their first eleven games, as they had a record of 1–5–5, however, the team rebounded, and put together a 16–12–8 record in the next 36 games to get to the .500 level.  The Black Hawks then got hot, as they then won six games in a row, followed shortly by a four-game winning streak, as the team managed to finish the season with a 31–26–13 record, tying a club record with 75 points, and setting a team record for wins in a season at 31, which was two more than the previous high of 29 set the previous season.

Offensively, Chicago was led by Bobby Hull, who set a team record with 50 goals and 84 points.  He became the third player in NHL history, Maurice Richard and Bernie Geoffrion were the others, to score 50 goals in a season. Hull's 84 points tied him with Andy Bathgate of the New York Rangers for the league lead, however, since Hull scored more goals, he was awarded the Art Ross Trophy.  Stan Mikita emerged as an offensive force, breaking out with a team high 52 assists and 77 points, while Bill Hay also recorded 52 assists en route to a 63-point season.  Pierre Pilote led the Hawks blueline, scoring 7 goals and 42 points, while tying Mikita and Eric Nesterenko for the most penalty minutes on the team, with 97.

In goal, Glenn Hall once again played in all 70 games, setting a team record for wins with 31, and posting a 2.63 GAA, along with 9 shutouts.

Chicago would face the Montreal Canadiens in the best of seven NHL semi-final for the fourth consecutive season.  The Canadiens were once again heavily favored to defeat the Hawks, as they had an NHL best 98 points, which was 23 more than Chicago.  Montreal opened the series off by winning the opening two games at the Montreal Forum by scores of 2–1 and 4–3 to take an early 2–0 series lead, however, as the series shifted over to Chicago Stadium, the Black Hawks took advantage, winning the next two games by scores of 4–1 and 5–3 to even up the series.  The fifth game was back in Montreal, however, Chicago stayed hot, and narrowly defeated the Canadiens 4–3 to return home with a 3–2 series lead.  The Hawks again took advantage of their home ice, shutting out the Canadiens 2–0, and eliminating Montreal for the second straight season, and earning a spot in the finals.

Chicago would face the Toronto Maple Leafs in the 1962 Stanley Cup Finals.  The Leafs had a strong regular season, earning 85 points, and had defeated the fourth place New York Rangers to clinch a spot in the finals.  The series opened at Maple Leaf Gardens in Toronto, and much like their previous series against the Canadiens, the Black Hawks quickly found themselves down 2–0, as Toronto won the first two games by scores of 4–1 and 3–2.  The next two games were held in Chicago, and the Black Hawks continued their home ice winning streak, taking the two games by scores of 3–0 and 4–1 to pull even.  The clubs were back in Toronto for the fifth game, and it was the Maple Leafs easily beating Chicago 8–4 to take a 3–2 series lead.  Toronto ended Chicago's five game home winning streak in the sixth game, holding off Chicago for a 2–1 win, and ending the Hawks chance of a second straight championship.

Season standings

Record vs. opponents

Game log

Regular season

Playoffs

Season stats

Scoring leaders

Goaltending

Playoff stats

Scoring leaders

Goaltending

References

Sources
Hockey-Reference
Rauzulu's Street
Goalies Archive
National Hockey League Guide & Record Book 2007

Chicago Blackhawks seasons
Chicago
Chicago